The SMC Pentax-DA 50mm f/1.8 lens is a normal prime lens for the Pentax K-mount.  The 75mm equivalent focal length on APS-C cameras and fast f/1.8 aperture make it well suited for portrait photography.  It uses a simple double-Gauss design of 6 elements in 5 groups.

Similar lenses from other manufacturers include the Canon EF 50mm f/1.8 II and Nikon AF Nikkor 50 mm f/1.8D.

External links

Ricoh Imaging: SMC Pentax-DA 50mm f/1.8

50
Camera lenses introduced in 2012